The Battle of Ardres was fought on 6 June 1351 between French and English forces near the town of Ardres, Pas de Calais during the Hundred Years War.  The French won.

Prelude
The new English commander of Calais John de Beauchamp had been leading a raid around the region surrounding Saint-Omer with a force of some 300 men-at-arms and 300 mounted archers, when he was discovered by a French force led by Édouard I de Beaujeu, Lord of Beaujeu, the French commander on the march of Calais, near Ardres. The French moved to surround the English, trapping them upon a bend on the river. Beaujeu made all of his men dismount before they attacked, after lessons were learned from the 1349 Battle of Lunalonge under similar conditions when they kept too many of their men mounted, dividing their forces too quickly, which caused the French to lose the battle.

The battle
In the fighting Édouard I de Beaujeu was killed but with the help of reinforcements from the garrison of Saint-Omer the French defeated the English. John Beauchamp was one of many English captured.

References

Conflicts in 1351
Battles of the Hundred Years' War
Battles in Hauts-de-France
Military history of the Pas-de-Calais
1351 in England
1350s in France
Hundred Years' War, 1337–1360